Sjøvegan is the administrative centre of Salangen Municipality in Troms og Finnmark county, Norway.  The village is located at the end of the Sagfjorden, a branch of the Salangen fjord. The river Salangselva empties into the fjord at Sjøvegan. The river flows through the lakes Nervatnet and Øvrevatnet just to the east of the village.

The home venue of the Salangen IF team is located in Sjøvegan. Salangen Church is also located in the village.

Name
The name is the plural of "Sjøveg" which means vei ned til sjøen or "the way down to the sea".

Media gallery

References

Villages in Troms
Populated places of Arctic Norway
Salangen